Vidhya Mandhir Institute of Technology (VMIT) is an engineering college in Erode district, Tamil Nadu, India, that opened in 2011. It is affiliated to Anna University in Chennai.

References

External links
 VMIT website

Address :
Chennimalai State Highway, Ingur, Perundurai Taluk, Erode

Location: Erode-Tamil Nadu

Website : www.vmit.ac.in

College Type: Affiliated College

University Name : Anna University, Chennai

University Type : State PublicUniversity

Established Year : 2011

Approved By:
Statutory Body All India Council For Technical Education (AICTE)

Engineering colleges in Tamil Nadu
Universities and colleges in Erode district
Colleges affiliated to Anna University
Educational institutions established in 2011
2011 establishments in Tamil Nadu